Louis I of Hesse (6 February 1402 - 17 January 1458), called "the Peaceful", was Landgrave of Lower Hesse (Hesse) from 1413 to 1458.

He was born at Spangenberg, the son of Hermann II, Landgrave of Hesse and Margaret, the daughter of Frederick V of Nuremberg.  He married Anna (5 June 1420 - 17 September 1462) daughter of Frederick I, Elector of Saxony on 13 September 1436.  Their children were:

Louis II (7 September 1438 - 8 November 1471)
Henry III (15 October 1440 - 13 January 1483)
Hermann IV, Archbishop of Cologne (1450 - 19 October 1508)
Elisabeth (14 December 1453 - 22 April 1489), married John III, Count of Nassau-Weilburg
Friedrich (1458- 1 June 1463)
Berthold Reinemann (1438) - Illegitimate son of Louis I, Landgrave of Hesse (https://gedbas.genealogy.net/person/show/1282276047)
  
After 1425 a conflict with the Electorate of Mainz over claims to power in Hesse broke out into open conflict and Archbishop Conrad III of Mainz suffered a decisive defeat at Fulda in 1427.

Ancestry

External links
 Ludwig I. v. Hessen Allgemeine Deutsche Biographie. Band 52, Duncker & Humblot, Leipzig 1906, p. 115.

|-

1402 births
1458 deaths
People from Schwalm-Eder-Kreis
House of Hesse
Landgraves of Hesse
Medieval child monarchs
Burials at St. Elizabeth's Church, Marburg